Pirates of Tripoli is a 1955 American adventure film directed by Felix E. Feist and starring Paul Henreid and Patricia Medina.

Plot
Princess Karjan promises pirate captain Edri-Al-Gardian a fabulous reward if he helps her regain her lost kingdom of Misurata from Malek. When the latter destroys Gardian's armada, Karjan and Gardian enter Misurata in disguise in order to get Karjan's hidden jewels to buy new ships.

Cast
 Paul Henreid as Edri-Al-Gadrean
 Patricia Medina as Princess Karjan
 Paul Newlan as Hammid Khassen
 John Miljan as Malek
 Mark Hanna as Ben Ali
 Jean Del Val as Abu Tala
 Lilian Bond as Sono
 Mel Welles as Gen. Tomedi
 Louis Mercier as The Cat (as Louis G. Mercier)
 Karl Davis as Assassin 
 Maralou Gray as Rhea

Production
It was the second swashbuckler Henreid made for Katzman, after Last of the Buccaneers and like that it did "extremely well", with the actor getting a percentage of the profits.

References

External links

Pirates of Tripoli at TCMDB
Pirates Life Apparel
Review of film at Variety

1955 films
1950s historical adventure films
American historical adventure films
American swashbuckler films
Pirate films
Films set in the Mediterranean Sea
Columbia Pictures films
1950s English-language films
Films directed by Felix E. Feist
1950s American films